Yugoslavia is a nation that competed at three consecutive Hopman Cup tournaments before the breakup of the country in the early 1990s. It first competed in the inaugural Hopman Cup in 1989. Yugoslavia won the tournament on one occasion, in 1991.

Players
This is a list of players who have played for Yugoslavia in the Hopman Cup.

Results

References

See also
Croatia at the Hopman Cup
Serbia and Montenegro at the Hopman Cup

Hopman Cup teams
Hopman Cup